WLIH is a Christian radio station licensed to Whitneyville, Pennsylvania, broadcasting on 107.1 MHz FM. The station is owned by Good Christian Radio Broadcasting, Inc.

WLIH's programming includes Christian talk and teaching shows such as Focus on the Family, Joyce Meyer, Living on the Edge with Chip Ingram, Faith Family Radio with Pastor Ken Schoonover, Daily Hope with Rick Warren, and MoneyWise with Howard Dayton and Steve Moore. WLIH also airs a variety of contemporary Christian music.

WLIH signed on March 15, 1987. The license expired unrenewed on August 1, 2022, leading to the Federal Communications Commission (FCC) canceling it on November 7. On November 16, the FCC reinstated WLIH's license and granted them special temporary authority to continue broadcasting, pending an application for reconsideration of the license cancellation and an application for renewal.

References

External links

LIH
Radio stations established in 1987
1987 establishments in Pennsylvania